G. Prasad Rao is an Indian politician and Member of Legislative Assembly in Andhra Pradesh. He belongs to Indian National Congress.

Early life
G. Prasad Rao was born in Vikarabad, Ranga Reddy district, Andhra Pradesh, India.

Career
G. Prasad Rao was elected to Vikrabad constituency in Ranga Reddy district defeating A. Chandrashkhar of Telangana Rashtra Samithi party.

References

Telugu politicians
Indian National Congress politicians from Andhra Pradesh
Living people
Andhra Pradesh MLAs 2009–2014
People from Ranga Reddy district
Year of birth missing (living people)